In enzymology, a camphor 1,2-monooxygenase is an enzyme that catalyzes the chemical reaction

(+)-bornane-2,5-dione + reduced rubredoxin + O2  5-oxo-1,2-campholide + oxidized rubredoxin + H2O

The 3 substrates of this enzyme are (+)-bornane-2,5-dione, reduced rubredoxin, and O2, whereas its 3 products are 5-oxo-1,2-campholide, oxidized rubredoxin, and H2O.

This enzyme belongs to the family of oxidoreductases, specifically those acting on paired donors, with O2 as oxidant and incorporation or reduction of oxygen. The oxygen incorporated need not be derived from O2 with reduced iron-sulfur protein as one donor, and incorporation o one atom of oxygen into the other donor. The systematic name of this enzyme class is (+)-camphor,reduced-rubredoxin:oxygen oxidoreductase (1,2-lactonizing). Other names in common use include 2,5-diketocamphane lactonizing enzyme, camphor ketolactonase I, oxygenase, camphor 1,2-mono, and ketolactonase I. It employs one cofactor, iron.

References

 
 
 

EC 1.14.15
Iron enzymes
Enzymes of unknown structure